The 1987–88 Argentine Primera División was the 97th season of top-flight football in Argentina. The season ran from August 30, 1987 to June 5, 1988.

Newell's Old Boys won its 2nd league title, with a squad and coaching staff made up entirely of players from the club's academy, while Banfield and Unión de Santa Fe were relegated.

League standings

Top scorers

Relegation

Unión de Santa Fe and Banfield were relegated with the worst points averages.

Liguilla Pre-Libertadores
Quarter-finals

Semi-finals

Final

San Lorenzo qualify for 1988 Copa Libertadores.

See also
1987–88 in Argentine football

References

Argentine Primera División seasons
1987–88 in Argentine football
Argentine
Argentine